Sir Timothy Julian Kerr (born 15 February 1958), styled The Hon. Mr Justice Kerr, is a judge of the High Court of England and Wales.

The son of Sir Michael Kerr, a German-born High Court judge, Kerr was educated at Westminster School and Magdalen College, Oxford. He was called to the Bar at Gray’s Inn in 1983, becoming a Bencher in 2015. He was appointed Queen's Counsel in 2001, and a Recorder from 2008. He sat as part time chairman of employment tribunals from 2001 to 2006. He also sat on various sports tribunals.

Kerr was appointed a Justice of the High Court (Queen's Bench Division) on 4 June 2015, on the retirement of Mr Justice Eder. He received the customary knighthood in November of that year.

References 

1958 births
Living people
People educated at Westminster School, London
Alumni of Magdalen College, Oxford
Members of Gray's Inn
English King's Counsel
21st-century King's Counsel
Queen's Bench Division judges
Knights Bachelor